Residence Synyohora is a National Natural Park of Ukraine that was created in 2009 out of the Presidential official residence located near the Huta rural council, Bohorodchany Raion (after 2020, Ivano-Frankivsk Raion). The residence also known as the winter residence is administered by the State Management of Affairs and funded by the state budget.

Built in 2001 as a sanatorium of the "Ivano-Frankivskghaz", the residence was transferred to state ownership in December 2002 by the Yanukovych government and turned into a national park in 2009.

It was agreed in accordance with the established procedure to include 10866 hectares of state-owned land in the territory of the Synihora National Nature Park, which are withdrawn from the state organization Residence Synihora and provided to the national nature park for permanent use.

References

External links
 Information at the State Management of Affairs website
 Kryshtopa, O., Amchuk, L. Kuchma residence in Huta: life of success! Ukrayinska Pravda. 2003-1-27
 Uhrynyuk, S. State residence "Synyohora" became a closed object. BBC Ukraine. 2012-12-30
 Parnikoza, I. In Carpathians. Hai Vei. 2012-7-3
 Abramov, V., Kharchenko, A., Gomon, D. New year of Yanukovych: excellent repair at the residence and pickled fish in Pochayiv. Newspaper "Segodnya". 2010-12-22
 "Synyohora" of Yanukovych ordered electricity and gaz for hundreds of thousands. Ukrayinska Pravda. 2012-12-26

Parks in Ukraine
National parks of Ukraine
Government of Ukraine
Geography of Ivano-Frankivsk Oblast
Protected areas of Ukraine